Carex oshimensis, the Japanese sedge (a name it shares with Carex morrowii), is a species of flowering plant in the genus Carex, native to Japan. With its striped foliage, it is widely used as a nonspreading ground cover. Its cultivar 'Evergold' has gained the Royal Horticultural Society's Award of Garden Merit. It is an easy subject for moist soils in sun or partial shade.

References

oshimensis
Ornamental plants
Endemic flora of Japan
Plants described in 1914